Portlaw GAA is a Gaelic Athletic Association club based in Portlaw, County Waterford, Ireland. The club enters teams in both codes.  Portlaw have been quite successful in hurling having won the Waterford Senior Hurling Championship on 6 occasions. They currently play both intermediate hurling and football in Waterford.

Honours
Waterford Senior Hurling Championships: 6
 1937, 1970(Ballyduff/Portlaw), 1971, 1973, 1976, 1977
Waterford Intermediate Hurling Championships: 2
 2004, 2015
 Waterford Junior Hurling Championships: 1
 1935
 Waterford Minor Hurling Championships: 1
 1982
 Waterford Under-21 Hurling Championships: 1
 1984
 Waterford Intermediate Football Championships: 2
 2016, 2021
 Waterford Junior Football Championships:
 1986, 2005

External links
 Official website

Gaelic games clubs in County Waterford
Hurling clubs in County Waterford
Gaelic football clubs in County Waterford